Ryan Yoshitomo Kurosaki (born July 3, 1952) is an American former professional baseball player whose career lasted for seven seasons (1974–1980). A right-handed pitcher, he appeared in seven games, all in relief, for the  St. Louis Cardinals. Kurosaki was the first American player in Major League Baseball of full East Asian descent. Mike Lum, whose mother was Japanese, first made it to the top level in 1967.

The ,  Kurosaki attended the University of Nebraska at Lincoln and signed with the Cardinals as an amateur free agent in 1974. Called up by St. Louis to the majors during his second professional season, he debuted on May 20, 1975, against the San Diego Padres and pitched 1⅔ hitless innings, although he walked three. In his seven MLB appearances, he did not earn a decision or a save, surrendering 15 hits (including three home runs) and 11 earned runs in 13 innings pitched. He issued seven walks and struck out six.

In 296 minor league games, all in the Cardinals organization and all but eight in relief, he compiled a 41–29 record with a 3.21 earned run average and 53 saves.

References

External links

1952 births
American baseball players of Japanese descent
Arkansas Travelers players
Baseball players from Hawaii
Hawaii people of Japanese descent
Living people
Major League Baseball pitchers
Modesto Reds players
Nebraska Cornhuskers baseball players
Springfield Redbirds players
St. Louis Cardinals players